The Green Party is a centre-left green political party in Norway. The party holds three seats in the Parliament of Norway (gaining 3.8% in the 2021 elections) and also has representation in municipal councils and county councils (gaining 6.8% in the 2019 elections). The Green Party advocates green politics, and has been described as centre-left by academics and voters. The party itself claims distance from the two dominant right-wing and left-wing political blocks, jointly denominated as "the fossil block", and have stated their refusal to form a government with any parties that will continue to drill for oil in the North Sea.

The Green Party is a member of the European Green Party and the Global Greens, and was founded with the German Greens as its stated model. It maintains close ties to other Green parties including the German Greens and the Swedish Greens. It is led by Arild Hermstad.

History
The process of forming a new national green party in Norway was initiated in December 1984, with the official launch in 1988. Among the pioneers were the late philosopher Arne Næss, peace researcher Johan Galtung, and the philosopher Sigmund Kvaløy Setreng.

In the local elections between 1991 and 2009 the Green Party had 6 - 8 representatives elected each time. In the national elections the party never exceeded 0.5% support.

Since 2005, the Greens have seen a significant membership rise, with the new members coming from a wide variety of other parties, including the seven established parliamentary parties.

In the municipal elections of 2011, the party saw its first local breakthrough, having garnered close to 22,000 votes on a national basis. Two years later, during the campaign for the 2013 general election, the party saw a significant rise in support in the opinion polls. The Greens were widely expected to gain parliamentary representation to some extent. In the election, the Greens gathered over 79,000 votes, making them the 8th biggest party in the country. This vote count translates to 2.8 percent of the vote. Rasmus Hansson, the party's top candidate from Oslo was elected to parliament, becoming the first ever Green MP.

In the local elections of 2015 the Green Party overtook the 4% nationally for the first time in its history and got the third place in Oslo.

Ideology
The Green Party is one of the global ecologist and environmentalist political parties and movements. As a member of the pan-European European Green Party, the Norwegian Greens subscribe to social progressivism and social justice. The main focus of the party is environmental protection and ecological sustainability. The party seeks to introduce a tax on wasteful consumption, and to reorganise the food industry. The Greens have also pledged support for a reform in the agrarian industry, increasing the production of organic crops and strengthening the eco-friendly agricultural sector.

The Green party seeks to reduce the Norwegian petroleum extraction in order to counteract serious climate change. The proposal is to stop extraction by 2035.

Leadership

Spokespersons
Ove Braaten, 1989–1991
Olav Benestad, 1991–1992
Jan Bojer Vindheim, 1993–1996 /1997–2001
Ane Aadland, 1995–1997
Arne Gravanes, 1996–1997
Birte Simonsen, 1998–1999
Brynmor Evans, 1998–1999
Gunter Schotz, 1999–2000
Lisa Fröyland, 1999–2002
Tove Funderud Johansen, 2000–2001
Birte Simonsen, 2002–2004
Brynmor Evans, 2004–2005
Trude Malthe Thomassen, 2004–2007
Gaute Busch, 2005–2006
Mats Indrefjord Høllesli, 2006–2007
Birte Simonsen, 2007–2008
Sondre Båtstrand, 2008–2011
Hanna Marcussen, 2008–2014
Harald August Nissen, 2011–2014
Hilde Opoku, 2014–2016
Rasmus Hansson, 2016–2018
Arild Hermstad, 2018–2020
Une Aina Bastholm, 2016–2020

Leaders
Une Aina Bastholm, 2020–22
Arild Hermstad, 2022–

Deputy leaders
Arild Hermstad, 2020–
Kriss Rokkan Iversen, 2020–2022
Ingrid Liland, 2022–
Lan Marie Berg, 2022–

Electoral results

See also 
 Green party
 List of environmental organizations

Notes

References

External links

 Official site

Green parties in Europe
1988 establishments in Norway
European Green Party
Environmental organisations based in Norway
Political parties established in 1988
Global Greens member parties
Political parties in Norway